These are the seasons of Thames Ironworks (1895–1900) and West Ham United from their year of formation to their most recent season. The club first competed in The Football League in 1919.

League seasons

Key

Pld – Matches played
W – Matches won
D – Matches drawn
L – Matches lost
GF – Goals for
GA – Goals against
Pts – Points
Pos – Final position

LL – London League
SL – Southern League
Div 1 – Football League First Division
Div 2 – Football League Second Division
Prem – Premier League
Champ – Football League Championship
n/a – Not applicable

Q1 – First qualifying round
Q2 – Second qualifying round etc.
PO – Play-off round
GS – Group stage
R1 – Round 1
R2 – Round 2
R3 – Round 3
R4 – Round 4
R5 – Round 5
QF – Quarter-finals
SF – Semi-finals
RU – Runners-up
W – Winners

Footnotes

References

Seasons
 
West Ham United F.C.